The Madras Bulls Motorcycling Club or Madbulls is an informal motorcycling club based in Chennai, Tamil Nadu, India.  The club was founded in April 2002, with the focus on the Royal Enfield Bullet series of motorcycles. The club came to being in April, 2002, with a passion towards the Royal Enfield Bullet with the tag line "To Hell with you, To Heaven with Us". As of 2015, they were the largest club in Chennai with more than 1,500 members.

References

External links
 

Motorcycle clubs
Clubs and societies in India